Chalinga pratti  is an East Palearctic butterfly in the family Nymphalidae (Limenitidinae). 

It is found in Ussuri (S. p. eximia (Moltrecht, 1909)) , China (nominate) and Korea (S. p. coreana (Matsumura, 1927)) 

The larva on feeds on Pinus koraienis.

References

Chalinga
Butterflies described in 1890